Fabio Siciliani  is a Muay thai kickboxer.
Six Times Professional World Champion Muay Thai (WAKO, ISKA, WKU, WMF PRO, WMF World Championship, ONE SONGCHAI), International Champion WAKO, One Songchai Champion, Italian Champion.
Muay Thai Khru.
Head Coach Italian Team.

Titles

Professional:
 2016 World Champion WKU PRO 75 kg 
 2014 Oktagon Champion
 2014 World Champion WMF PRO 75 kg 
 2014 Thai Boxe Mania Champion
 2013 World Champion Muay thai ISKA
 2012 Oktagon Champion 
 2011 OneSongchai World Champion tournament 
 2011 OneSongchai Champion
 2010 OneSongchai Muay Thai Italian Tournament Champion
 2009 World Champion Muay Thai Wako-Pro 71,8 kg
 2006 Intercontinental Champion Muay Thai Wako-Pro 71,8 kg
Amateur:
 2014 Gold Medal World Muay Thai Championship, Pattaya Thailand
 2009 Silver Medal World Muay Thai Championships, Bangkok Thailand
 2008 Italian Champion
 2005 Bronze Medal World Muay Thai Championships, Bangkok Thailand
 2004 Silver Medal European Championship, Praga EMC-WMF
 2002 Italian Champion

Muay Thai record

|-  style="background:#CCFFCC"
| 30.04.2016 || Win ||align=left| Jaouad El Byari || Fight Clubbing 20 || Kindergarten Bologna, Italy || KO || 1 ||
|-
|-  style="background:#FFBBBB"
| 11.04.2015 || Loss ||align=left| Karim Ghajji  || Oktagon 2015: 20 Years Edition || Milan, Italy || Decision (unanimous) || 3 ||
|-
|-  style="background:#CCFFCC"
| 21.03.2015 || Win ||align=left| Nordyne Said || La nuit du muay thai || Elouges, Belgio || Per decisione || 5 ||
|-
|-  style="background:#CCFFCC"
| 27.07.2014 || Win ||align=left| Dan Balsemao || WMF PRO - Evolution Fight || Rosolini, Italy || KOT || 2 ||
|-
|-  style="background:#CCFFCC"
| 05.04.2014 || Win ||align=left| Prakaysaeng Gaiyanghadao || Oktagon 2014 || Milano, Italy || Per decisione || 3 ||
|-
|-  style="background:#CCFFCC"
| 20.03.2014 || Win ||align=left| Fabio Teixeira || Final WMF World muay thai Championship || Pattaya, Thailand || Per decisione || 3 ||
|-
|-  style="background:#CCFFCC"
| 18.03.2014 || Win ||align=left| Bernardo Braga || Semi-final WMF World muay thai Championship || Pattaya, Thailand || Per decisione || 3 ||
|-
|-  style="background:#CCFFCC"
| 16.03.2014 || Win ||align=left| Wong Holan Hon Glina || WMF World muay thai Championship || Pattaya, Thailand || KO || 1 ||
|-
|-  style="background:#CCFFCC"
| 15.03.2014 || Win ||align=left| Atanan Bojinov || WMF World muay thai Championship || Pattaya, Thailand || Per decisione || 3 ||
|-
|-  style="background:#CCFFCC"
| 25.01.2014 || Win ||align=left| Orgest Farruku || Thai Boxe Mania || Torino, Italy || KO || 1 ||
|-
|-  style="background:#CCFFCC"
| 31.08.2013 || Win ||align=left| Mohamed Houmer || Evolution Fight || Rosolini, Italy || Per decisione || 5 ||
|-
|-  style="background:#CCFFCC"
| 31.05.2013 || Win ||align=left| Almeyda Dino || Fight Clubbing 10 || Kindergarten Bologna, Italy || KO || 1 ||
|-
|-  style="background:#c5d2ea"
| 02.02.2013 || Draw ||align=left| Nonsai Sor.Sanyakorn || Muay Thai Challenger || Lecce, Italy || Per Decisione || 3 ||
|-
|-  style="background:#FFBBBB"
| 07.01.2013 || Loss ||align=left| Faizal Ramli || I-1 World Muay Thai Championship || Hong Kong, Cina || Per decisione || 3 ||
|-
|-  style="background:#FFBBBB"
| 08.12.2012 || Loss ||align=left| Aydin Tuncay || International Fight Show 2012 || Loano, Italy || KOT || 2 ||
|-
|-  style="background:#CCFFCC"
| 08.12.2012 || Win ||align=left| Johane Beausejour || International Fight Show 2012 || Loano, Italy || Per Decisione || 3 ||
|-
|-  style="background:#c5d2ea"
| 29.09.2012 || Draw ||align=left| Giuseppe D'Amuri || La Notte dei Gladiatori 2 || Lecce, Italy || Per decisione || 3 || 
|-
|-  style="background:#CCFFCC"
| 27.04.2012 || Win ||align=left| Kevin Haas || Fight Clubbing 2, Kindergarten || Kindergarten Bologna, Italy || Per Decisione || 3 || 
|-
|-  style="background:#CCFFCC"
| 24.03.2012 || Win ||align=left| Marco Re || Oktagon 2012 || Milano, Italy || KOT || 1 ||
|-
|-  style="background:#c5d2ea"
| 04.02.2012 || Draw ||align=left| Sharos Huyer || Thai Boxe Mania 2012 || Totino, Italy || Per Decisione || 3 || 
|-
|-  style="background:#CCFFCC"
| 04.01.2012 || Win ||align=left| Saidou Diaby || Gran Gala Muay Thai || Lecce, Italy || KO || 1 ||
|-
|-  style="background:#CCFFCC"
| 04.06.2011 || Win ||align=left| Moses Tor Sangtiennoi || OneSongchai World Champion Tournament || Tivoli, Italy || Per Decisione || 3 ||
|-
|-  style="background:#CCFFCC"
| 04.06.2011 || Win ||align=left| Rosario Presti || OneSongchai World Champion Tournament || Tivoli, Italy || Per Decisione || 3 ||
|-
|-  style="background:#FFBBBB"
| 27.05.2011 || Loss ||align=left| Kevin Haas || La Nuit des Titans || Parigi, France] || Per Decisione || 3 ||
|-
|-  style="background:#CCFFCC"
| 11.04.2011 || Win ||align=left| Alex Galavotti || Italian Extreme 9 || Modena, Italy || Per Decisione || 5 ||
|-
|-  style="background:#CCFFCC"
| 12.02.2011 || Win ||align=left| Kwan Rahannok || Titolo Onesongchai || Lecce, Italy || Per Decisione || 5 || 
|-
|-  style="background:#CCFFCC"
| 05.12.2010 || Win ||align=left| Chongangdei P. Sripat || King's Cup || Bangkok, Thailand] || Per Decisione || 5 || 
|-
|-  style="background:#FFBBBB"
| 12.08.2010 || Loss ||align=left| Yaa || Queen's Cup || Bangkok, Thailand || Per Decisione || 3 || 
|-
|-  style="background:#FFBBBB"
| 01.05.2010 || Loss ||align=left| Cédric Muller || La Grande Sfida su 4 Angoli || Rimini, Italy || Per Decisione || 3 || 
|-
|-  style="background:#CCFFCC"
| 27.02.2010 || Win ||align=left| Lorenzo Capunata || Italian Extreme 8, Onesongchai Italian Tournament || Modena, Italy || KO || 3 || 
|-
|-  style="background:#CCFFCC"
| 27.02.2010 || Win ||align=left| Fernando Calzetta || Italian Extreme 8, Onesongchai Italian Tournament || Modena, Italy || KO || 2 || 
|-
|-  style="background:#CCFFCC"
| 05.12.2009 || Win ||align=left| Satanveha Luktapfa || Onesongchai Promotion || Bangkok, Thailand || Per Decisione || 5 || 
|-
|-  style="background:#FFBBBB"
| 05.12.2009 || Loss ||align=left| No name || King's Cup || Bangkok, Thailand || Per Decisione || 5 ||
|-
|-  style="background:#FFBBBB"
| 12.07.2009 || Loss ||align=left| Farid Villaume || Wako-Pro World Title || Marrakech, Marocco || KO || 2 ||
|-
|-  style="background:#CCFFCC"
| 11.04.2009 || Win ||align=left| Ante Lucic || Wako-Pro World Title || Lecce, Italy || KO || 1 || 
|-
|-  style="background:#FFBBBB"
| 17–21.03.2009 || Loss ||align=left| || World Championship WMF  || Bangkok, Thailand || Decision || 4 || 
|-
|-  style="background:#CCFFCC"
| 17–21.03.2009 || Win ||align=left| || World Championship WMF  || Bangkok, Thailand || KO || 2 ||
|-
|-  style="background:#CCFFCC"
| 17–21.03.2009 || Win ||align=left| || World Championship WMF  || Bangkok, Thailand || KO || 1 ||
|-
|-  style="background:#c5d2ea"
| 06.07.2008 || Draw ||align=left| Abdallah Mabel || The Warrior's Fighting 9 || Montecatini Terme, Italy || Per Decisione || 5 || 
|-
|-  style="background:#CCFFCC"
| 21.01.2008 || Win ||align=left| Fabio Fanti || Italian Championship || Napoli, Italy || Per Decisione || 3 ||
|-
|-  style="background:#FFBBBB"
| 09.12.2007 || Loss ||align=left| Dmitry Valent || Wako-Pro World Title || Lecce, Italy || KO || 4 ||
|-
|-  style="background:#CCFFCC"
| 25.11.2007 || Win ||align=left| Pendar ||  || Santeramo in Colle, Italy || KO || 2 || 
|-
|-  style="background:#CCFFCC"
| 05.05.2007 || Win ||align=left| Boudrir ||  || Bologna, Italy || KO || 1 ||
|-
|-  style="background:#FFBBBB"
| 05.04.2007 || Loss ||align=left| Armen Petrosyan || Trieste Fight Night || Trieste, Italy || KOT || 4 || 
|-
|-  style="background:#CCFFCC"
| 27.11.2006 || Win ||align=left| Arnaldo Silva || Gladiatori 5 || Bologna, Italy || KO || 5 || 
|-
|-  style="background:#CCFFCC"
| 30.07.2006 || Win ||align=left| Diego Ballardin || || Jesolo, Italy || Per Decisione|| 5 ||
|-
|-  style="background:#CCFFCC"
| 20.05.2006 || Win ||align=left| Luca Caputo || || Bologna, Italy || Per Decisione || 5 || 
|-
|-  style="background:#CCFFCC"
| 27.11.2005 || Win ||align=left| Marco Santi || Gladiatori 4 || Bologna, Italy || Per Decisione || 5 || 
|-
|-
| colspan=9 | Legend:

References

Living people
Italian Muay Thai practitioners
1981 births